is an anime OVA about a high school girl who discovers that she is really part of a royal lineage of aliens from a distant planet.  The anime was released in the United States by Central Park Media.

This anime is part Sci-Fi and part Magical Girl similar to Sailor Moon and Galaxy Fraulein Yuna.

Plot 
While Koichi Amagi is making a marriage proposal to his beloved Miki, a space ship fell right in front of them. Inside the space ship there was a little girl who they adopted and named Hikaru. Years are passing by normally while Hikaru is living her life as a normal girl, with a mad scientist as her father. Someday aliens are appearing to retrieve Hikaru back from Earth as she is an Alien and is the last member of a royal familyline of a planet far away.

Video game

A game based on this OVA was released for the PlayStation in Japan which is an action sidescrolling platformer similar to Metroid and Megaman.

The game's plot closely follows the OVA's storyline, except for a few minor differences. Unlike the anime where Hikaru only fights in her standard armor, in the game she gets multiple different styles of armor upgrades after defeating a boss, similar to Megaman ZX's Bio Metal System.

Episodes
There are 3 episodes:
 An Eventful Double Date (愛と爆発のグループ交際、Ai to bakuhatsu no gurūpu kōsai)
 A Heroic Transfer Student (転校生は素敵なヒロイン、Tenkōsei wa sutekina hiroin)
 Give Me Courage (告白…勇気をください…、Kokuhaku… yūki o kudasai…)

Music
Ending theme "The Moment When You Softly Swear" (そっと誓う瞬間-とき-、Sotto Chikau Chunkan Toki) by Junko Iwao

Reception
Bamboo Dong of Anime News Network described Hyper Speed GranDoll as being very predictable, comparing it to a "color by numbers" book.  However, said that it was still entertaining enough to warrant a rental.  Chris Beveridge of Mania.com expressed similar sentiments, calling the anime "fun" but also "by the numbers".

References

External links
 

1997 anime OVAs
Bandai Visual
Central Park Media
Science fiction anime and manga